The 1927 Tour de France featured the first win by Nicolas Frantz, a cyclist from Luxembourg. Frantz had come in second in the previous tour, and went on to win the tour in 1928 as well. It also showcased the debuts of André Leducq (4th) and Antonin Magne (6th), two French riders who would win the Tour de France in coming years.

Cyclists

By team

By starting number

By nationality

References

1927 Tour de France
1927